This list includes authors who have written prose in the Uzbek language.

 Abdulla Qahhor
 Abdulla Qodiriy
 Abdulrauf Fitrat
 Gʻafur Gʻulom
 Hamza Hakimzade Niyazi
 Jahangir Mamatov
 Hamid Ismailov

See also 
 List of Uzbek-language poets

Uzbek writers
Lists of Uzbekistani people